Christopher James Devlin (born November 22, 1953) is a former professional American football player who played linebacker for four seasons in the National Football League. Devlin played at the collegiate level at Penn State University.

References

1953 births
Living people
Players of American football from Pennsylvania
American football linebackers
Penn State Nittany Lions football players
Cincinnati Bengals players
Chicago Bears players